

Dinosaurs

Newly named dinosaurs
Data courtesy of George Olshevsky's dinosaur genera list.

Plesiosaurs
 Plesiosaur gastroliths documented.

Synapsids

Non-mammalian

References

 Sanders F, Manley K, Carpenter K. Gastroliths from the Lower Cretaceous sauropod Cedarosaurus weiskopfae. In: Tanke D.H, Carpenter K, editors. Mesozoic vertebrate life: new research inspired by the paleontology of Philip J. Currie. Indiana University Press; Bloomington, IN: 2001. pp. 166–180.
 Shuller; 1950; A new elasmosaur from the Eagle Ford shale of Texas - The elasmosaur and its environment (Part II); University press in Dallas southern Methodist University. Fondren Science Series pp. 1–32

1950s in paleontology
Paleontology
Paleontology 0